Yatesville is a borough in the Greater Pittston area of Luzerne County, Pennsylvania. The population was 638 as of the 2020 census.

History
In 1809, Joel Hale built the first frame house in what is now known as Yatesville. Mr. Hale owned most of the borough site. On May 20, 1878, Yatesville broke away from Jenkins Township and became a borough. The first election for the new community was held in June. The first burgess was T. T. Hale.

Geography

Yatesville is located at  (41.302947, -75.781651). The borough is served by the Pittston Area School District.

Demographics

At the 2000 census there were 649 people, 233 households, and 188 families in the borough. The population density was 1,171.1 people per square mile (455.6/km2). There were 241 housing units at an average density of 434.9 per square mile (169.2/km2).  The racial makeup of the borough was 99.69% White, 0.15% African American, and 0.15% from two or more races.
There were 233 households, 31.8% had children under the age of 18 living with them, 63.5% were married couples living together, 12.9% had a female householder with no husband present, and 18.9% were non-families. 16.3% of households were made up of individuals, and 7.3% were one person aged 65 or older. The average household size was 2.79 and the average family size was 3.11.

The age distribution was 22.8% under the age of 18, 6.0% from 18 to 24, 31.7% from 25 to 44, 25.4% from 45 to 64, and 14.0% 65 or older. The median age was 38 years. For every 100 females there were 80.3 males. For every 100 females age 18 and over, there were 82.8 males.

The median household income was $46,429 and the median family income  was $57,813. Males had a median income of $41,176 versus $23,333 for females. The per capita income for the borough was $24,551. About 1.5% of families and 2.9% of the population were below the poverty line, including 2.6% of those under age 18 and 5.6% of those age 65 or over.

References

Populated places established in 1809
Boroughs in Luzerne County, Pennsylvania
1878 establishments in Pennsylvania